The 1972–73 County Championship was the 31st season of the Liga IV, the fourth tier of the Romanian football league system. The champions of each county association promoted to Divizia C without promotion play-off. The promotion play-off was not held this season, due to the expansion of Divizia C from next season, from twelve series with 14 teams to twelve series of 16 teams.

County leagues

Arad County

Galați County

Harghita County

Hunedoara County 
Valea Jiului Series

 Valea Mureșului Series 

 Championship final 

Dacia Orăștie won the 1972–73 Hunedoara County Championship and promoted to 1973–74 Divizia C.

Maramureș County

Neamț County

Prahova County

See also 
 1972–73 Divizia A
 1972–73 Divizia B
 1972–73 Divizia C

References

External links
 

Liga IV seasons
4
Romania